Edson Borges (born January 20, 1985 in Gaspar), is a Brazilian defender. He currently plays for Santa Cruz.

External links
 Ogol
 Soccerway
 Sambafoot
 Grupo Empenho

1985 births
Living people
Brazilian footballers
Santa Cruz Futebol Clube players
Santos FC
Association football forwards